Heinrich von Brandt (2 August 1789, in Łąkie near Posen – 23 January 1868, in Berlin) was a Prussian general and military author.

Biography

Military career
He studied law in Berlin. In 1807, he joined the army. The Peace of Tilsit made him a subject of the Grand Duchy of Warsaw, and as such he fought in the War of the Fifth Coalition in Spain and Napoleon's invasion of Russia. At the Battle of Leipzig, he was wounded and captured by the Russians, who forced him into the Polish army. In 1816, he entered the Prussian army and became a member of the general staff. He took part in the Polish revolts of 1831 and 1848, the latter of which he helped to suppress. He retired from the army in 1857 with the rank of general of infantry.

Political service
He was elected a member of the Prussian Upper Chamber in 1849 and of the Erfurt Parliament in 1850.

Family
His son, Max von Brandt, was a noted German diplomat.

Works
Von Brandt is most notable for his writings, chief of which are:

 Geschichte des Kriegswesens (Berlin, 1830–35)
 Grundzüge der Taktik der drei Waffen (1883)
 Der kleine Krieg (2d ed, 1850)
  In the Legions of Napoleon: The Memoirs of a Polish Officer in Spain and Russia, 1808-1813 (London, 1999)

Notes

References
  This work in turn cites:
 Aus dem Leben des General Brandt, a work by his son (2 vols., Berlin, 1882)
 

1789 births
1868 deaths

Generals of Infantry (Prussia)
Prussian politicians
German male writers
Members of the Frankfurt Parliament